Miguel Praia (born 2 March 1978) is a retired Portuguese motorcycle racer. He now works on the broadcast team for MotoGP in Portugal.

Career

Portuguese championships
Praia was born in Portalegre, Portugal. His first race was in 1994 at the age of 16 on a Yamaha TZR50. In 1997 he rode a full championship for the first time, finishing 3rd overall riding a Yamaha TZR125.

After the death of his brother Alberto Praia, he stopped racing, but returned in 1999 riding a Yamaha TZ125 in the Portuguese 125GP championship, finishing in 6th place.

In 2000, Praia had a good year in the newly-established Aprilia Challenge 125cc, ending most races in 1st place and setting several lap records, but a jury decision in the last round placed him in 2nd position overall.

In 2001, Praia moved up into the 600cc category. He finished in 8th position in Troféu Honda CBR600RR.

After a not outstanding year in a supersport class, 2002 was Praia's breakout year. He set new lap records in most rounds, and became champion for Troféu Honda CBR600RR 2002. In 2003 he repeated this achievement, winning the champion's title for Troféu Honda CBR600RR again.

In 2005, at the end of the Portuguese Stocksport 1000 championship, he entered the Superbike World Championship, winning the last two races on a Honda CBR1000RR he had never ridden before.

European championships
In an attempt to get more and better experience from an international competition, in 2002 and 2003 Miguel Praia raced in European Supersport Championship, as the highest-performing Portuguese racer.

World championships
By invitation of the Portuguese Government, Miguel Praia participated in the Macau Grand Prix in 2002 and in 2003, finishing 5th and 4th respectively. In 2003 he entered the Portuguese round of the MotoGP 250cc championship as a wildcard and finished 22nd.

2004 was his first year in full World class championships. He joined team NCR Ducati in the Superbike World Championship along with his teammate Garry McCoy. As the number 2 in the team and a newcomer into the Superbikes world, Praia had a disappointing season, racing on a Ducati 999RS and then a Ducati 998RS. He finished the championship in 30th place.

He switched teams the following year to join DFX Extreme team with a Yamaha R1 in 2005, and saw much improvement in his lap times, but in a year with many newcomers from other world championships in the Superbikes class, his finishing placing dropped to 34th.

Praia switched to a lower class in 2006, the Supersport World Championship, but this time with a new Portuguese team, Parkalgar Racing Team, and riding a Honda CBR600RR. The team experiences some problems in getting the right setup for the machine, and the year did not go well; Praia had to abandon some races due to mechanical failures, and eventually retired from the championship.

In 2007, Praia made better lap times compared with the previous years, but more new rivals from Superbikes and other world championships also joined the championship, and his faster speeds were not reflected in the final standings, again finishing 34th.

In 2008 the Parkalgar Racing Team secured Factory Honda support and a new Honda CBR600RR better shaped then the previous year's ones. The pre-season tests at Almería (Circuito de Almería) in January raised expectations for the team, with Praia's team-mate Craig Jones setting a new lap record for the track and Miguel Praia less than a second behind.

Career highlights
 1997 - 3rd place in 125cc Produção (Portuguese championship)
 1999 - 6th place in 125GP (Best Rookie) (Portuguese championship)
 2000 - 2nd place in Aprilia Challenge 125cc (Portuguese championship)
 2001 - 8th place in Troféu Honda CBR600RR (Portuguese championship)
 2002 - Champion in Troféu Honda CBR600RR (Portuguese championship)
 2002 - Best Portuguese in European Supersport Championship
 2002 - 5th place in Macau GP
 2003 - Champion in Troféu Honda CBR600RR
 2003 - 22nd place in Portuguese round (in Autódromo do Estoril) of MotoGP 250cc
 2003 - Best Portuguese in European Supersport Championship
 2003 - 4th place in Macau GP
 2004 - 30th place in Superbike World Championship (Best Rookie)
 2005 - 34th place in Superbike World Championship
 2006 - Not-classified in Supersport World Championship
 2007 - 34th place in Supersport World Championship
 2008 - 25th place in Supersport World Championship
 2009 - 15th place in Supersport World Championship
 2010 - 12th place in Supersport World Championship
 2011 - 13th place in Supersport World Championship
 2012 - 23rd place in CEV Moto2 Championship
 2013 - 4th place in Brazilian Moto 1000 GP Championship
 2014 - 4th place in Brazilian Moto 1000 GP Championship
 2015 - 4th place in Brazilian Moto 1000 GP Championship

Career statistics

Grand Prix motorcycle racing

Races by year
(key) (Races in bold indicate pole position, races in italics indicate fastest lap)

Superbike World Championship

Races by year
(key) (Races in bold indicate pole position, races in italics indicate fastest lap)

Supersport World Championship

Races by year
(key) (Races in bold indicate pole position, races in italics indicate fastest lap)

External links 
miguel-praia.com - Official site 
MotoGP.com rider profile
WorldSBK.com rider profile
Miguel Praia Sport Tv - YouTube video interview for Sport TV 
CBRWorld.net Interview - Video interview with Praia after the 2005 World SBK Season 

1978 births
Living people
Supersport World Championship riders
Superbike World Championship riders
Portuguese motorcycle racers
250cc World Championship riders
People from Portalegre, Portugal
Sportspeople from Portalegre District